Craterophorus is a genus of flies in the family Dolichopodidae from the Afrotropical realm.

Species
Craterophorus currani Grichanov, 1998
Craterophorus mirabilis Lamb, 1922
Craterophorus mirus Lamb, 1921
Craterophorus parenti Grichanov, 1998
Craterophorus permirus Lamb, 1922

References 

Dolichopodidae genera
Medeterinae
Diptera of Africa